Ukhta is a town in the Komi Republic, Russia.

Ukhta may also refer to:
Ukhta Urban Okrug, a municipal formation which the town of republic significance of Ukhta in the Komi Republic, Russia is incorporated as
Ukhta (inhabited locality), several inhabited localities in Russia
Ukhta Airport, a civilian airport in the Komi Republic, Russia
Ukhta (river), a river in the Komi Republic, Russia
Kalevala, a settlement in Karelia called Ukhta until 1963